Rabih az-Zubayr ibn Fadl Allah or Rabih Fadlallah, usually known as Rabah in French (c. 1842 – April 22, 1900), was a Sudanese warlord and slave trader who established a powerful empire east of Lake Chad, in today's Chad.

Born around 1842 to an Arabic tribe in Halfaya Al-Muluk, a suburb of Khartoum, he first served with the irregular Egyptian cavalry in the Ethiopian campaign, during which he was wounded. When Rabih left the army in 1860s, he became the principal lieutenant of the Sudanese slaveholder Sebehr Rahma.

Lieutenant of al-Zubayr (1870–1879) 

In the 19th century, Khartoum had become a very important Arab slave market, supplied through companies of Khartumi established in the region of Bahr el Ghazal, where they resided in zarības, thornbush-fortified bases kept by bāzinqirs (firearm-equipped slave soldiers). The warlord and slaveholder al-Zubayr Rahma Mansur assumed control of the region's zaribas, and was nominated in 1872 pasha and governor of Bahr el Ghazal for the khedive Isma'il, ruler of Egypt. Rabih, who was possibly a relative of al-Zubayr, was the chief lieutenant of the pasha.

In 1874, al-Zubayr conquered the Sultanate of Darfur. In 1876, he went to Cairo to request the khedive to officially sanction his position in Darfur, but was instead imprisoned. This caused in 1878 the revolt of al-Zubayr's son, Suleyman, and of his lieutenants, like Rabih. In reaction the governor-general of Sudan, Charles George Gordon, made Romolo Gessi governor of Bahr el Ghazal, and sent him to suppress the rebellion; Suleyman surrendered July 15, 1879, and was executed. Rabih instead is said to have left Suleyman the day before he surrendered, but Gessi reports instead that he had retreated already in June, after having suffered heavy losses.

Warlord (1879–1890)
To escape from Egypt, Rabih left the Bahr el Ghazal, heading south with 700–800 bazingiris and 400 rifles. Using the tactics of the Khartumi, in the 1880s he carved out a kingdom between the basins of the Nile and the Ubangi, in the country of Kreich and Dar Benda, south of Ouaddai, a region he utterly devastated.

In 1885, he attempted to return in Sudan following the invitation of the Mahdi Muhammad Ahmad, who had taken Khartoum from Egypt. The Mahdi had sent as ambassadors Zin el-Abeddin and Jabar, and Rabih followed them back to Darfur, proposing to meet the Mahdi at Omdurman; but when he learned of a plot to kill him, he changed his mind and returned to Chad.

In 1887, Rabih's forces invaded Darfur, recruited bazingirs, and settled down in Dar Kouti; however, his campaign against the aguid Salamat Cherif ed-Din, commander of the sultan of Ouaddai's troops, failed. In 1890, he attacked the Muslim chief Kobur in the north of Oubangui-Chari, deposed him and established in his place his nephew Mahdi al-Senoussi, on whom he imposed his suzerainty. This alliance was sealed by the marriage of Khadija, daughter of Al-Mahdi al-Senoussi, with Rabih's son Fadlallah. Together Mohammed and Rabih attacked Dar Runga, Kreich, Goula and then Banda Ngao.

First confrontations with France (1891–1893) 
Mohammed al-Senoussi's alliance with Rabih worried the colonial powers, especially France that was considering taking control of central Africa. Mohammed al-Senoussi remained faithful to Rabih and in 1891 killed the French Paul Crampel in Dar Banda. Rabih recovered the expedition's weapons.

In the south-east of Lake Chad, he attacked the Baguirmi Kingdom in 1892, blaming the Mbang (king) Abd ar Rahman Gwaranga for having signed a protectorate with the French. Gwaranga was besieged for three to five months in Manjaffa, and was later forced to leave his capital, which was completely destroyed in March 1893.

Conquest of Borno (1893) 

In 1893, Rabih also turned his attentions to the Borno Empire of Shehu (king) Ashimi of Borno. Borno was a Sahelian Kingdom that  had existed for several centuries. That year, the empire consisted of 80,000 soldiers, mostly slaves commanded by slaves, and was in full decline.

On the road to Borno, Rabih made prisoner the sultan of Karnak Logone, whose capital promptly opened its doors to his host. Shehu Ashimi of Borno sent 15,000 men to confront Rabih; the latter routed them in May or September 1893 first at Am Hobbio (south of Dekoa) and then at Legaroua with only 2,000 horses. Ashimi fled north of the Komadougou Yobe from where he may have tried to negotiate with Rabih; but he was assassinated at the instigation of his nephew Kyari, who then became shehu and decided to fight Rabih. Rabih met Kyari at Gashegar, a two days' walk from Kukawa, the capital of Borno; Kiyari defeated Rabih and captured his camp. The following day Rabih gathered his forces, and ordered 100 lashes be given to all his bannermen, including his own favored son Fadlallah. Only Boubakar, who had fought bravely, was spared. Then he ordered a victorious counter-offensive; Kyari, who had refused to flee, was captured and beheaded. As for the capital city, Kukawa, it was plundered and razed to the ground.

Rabih made Dikwa his capital, and there built a palace which was to win later the admiration of the French governor Émile Gentil. Local legend says that during construction there was a shortage of water, and blood was substituted to mix with sand for its walls.

Borno's Lord (1893–1900) 

Wanting to modernize his army, Rabih attempted in 1895 to make an accord with Royal Niger Company in Yola and Ibi so to obtain gunpowder and ammunition, but without success. He started confronting the Company in 1896 and the following year even started marching on Kano, while his vassal Muhammad al-Senussi in Dar al Kuti founded a fortified capital, Ndele, between Bahr Aouk and the Ubangi River, which the Senussites held until 1911.

For seven years Rabih was shehu of the Borno Empire, and spent much effort to reinvigorate a decadent empire that had until then maintained the same feudal structures it had in the 16th century. Rabih kept the vassal sultans in place, but subjected them to his lieutenants, who were mostly Arab Sudanese like he was. He promulgated a legal code based on sharia, rationalized taxation through the creation of a budget, imposed on Borno a military dictatorship, which aroused the attention of the colonial powers. Émile Gentil was to speak of Rabih's reforms in Borno with a certain degree of interest; they would later inspire him in organizing the territory of Chad.

Much is told about his brutality (for example, he once had one of his concubines executed because she kept a talisman designed to obtain Rabih's love, and with her the marabout who had deciphered the talisman); or about the evenings he passed listening to Ali, the poet who sang his exploits.

More importantly, Rabih launched a regular series of razzias to plunder and capture slaves; this was a return to the traditional activity of the sultans of Borno, which had been described in 1526 by Leo Africanus. It is estimated that 1,500–2,000 slaves were exported every year by his vassal Mahdi as-Senoussi, excluding the deaths, casualties, and other losses he inflicted. The totals for Rabah must have been much higher.

Direct conflict with the French (1899–1900) 

In 1899 Rabah had at his disposal 10,000 men among infantry and cavalry, all provided with rifles (mostly obsolete, except for 400 rifles of newer make), plus a great number of auxiliaries equipped with spears or bows. He kept garrisons at Baggara and Karnak Logone.

In 1899, Rabih received in Dekoa the French explorer Ferdinand de Béhagle. The discussions between them degenerated, and Béhagle was arrested. On July 17, Lieutenant Bretonnet, who had been sent by France against Rabih, was killed with most of his men at the battle of Togbao, at the edge of the Chari River, in present-day Sarh. Rabih gained three cannons from this victory (which the French recaptured at Kousséri) and ordered his son Fadlallah, whom he had left in Dikoa, to hang Béhagle.

In response, a French Army column, proceeding from Gabon and led by Émile Gentil, supported by the steamboat Leon Blot, confronted Rabih at Kouno at the end of the year. Even if the French were repulsed with losses, this did not prevent them from continuing and taking Kousséri. Here, they combined with the Lamy column, which had arrived from Algeria, and the Joalland-Meynier column, which had marched from Niger. Lamy assumed command of the combined forces.

The final showdown between Rabih and the French took place on April 22, 1900. The French forces consisted of 700 men, plus the 600 riflemen and 200 cavalry provided by the allied Baguirmi people. Leaving Kousséri in three columns, the French attacked Rabih's camp. Although the commander Lamy was killed in the ensuing battle, Rabih's forces were overwhelmed and, while fleeing across the Chari River, Rabih was killed.

With Rabih's defeat, his empire rapidly disintegrated. A year later his son Fadlallah was defeated and killed. All Rabih's territories fell into French hands, except for Borno which went to Britain.

References
 This article draws heavily on the Rabah article in the French-language Wikipedia.
 Gaston Dujarric, La vie du sultan Rabah, Paris, 1902
 Von Oppenheim, Rabeh und das Tsadseegebiet, Berlin, 1902
 A. Babikir, L'Empire du Rabih, Paris, 1954
 Encyclopædia Britannica, "Rabih az-Zubayr", (2000)
 
 Amegboh, Joseph, and Cécile Clairval, Rabah : Conquérant Des Pays Tchadiens, Grandes Figures Africaines (Paris: Dakar ; Abidjan : [Afrique Biblio Club] ; [Nouvelles Éditions Africaines], 1976).
 Horowitz, Michael, ‘Ba Karim: An Account of Rabeh’s Wars’, African Historical Studies, 3 (1970), 391–402.
 Mohammed, Kyari, Borno in the Rabih Years, 1893-1901 : the Rise and Crash of a Predatory State (Maiduguri Nigeria: University of Maiduguri, 2006).

Specific

External links
 

Sudanese people of Nubian descent
19th century in Chad
History of Nigeria
People of French West Africa
1840s births
1900 deaths
African slave traders
19th-century African businesspeople